"Body" is a song recorded by American R&B singer Marques Houston. It is the second single from Houston's fourth studio album Mr. Houston, and was released in parallel to the single "Sunset".

Music video
A music video for "Body" was released in August 2009 at the same time that the video for the single "Sunset" was released. The video was directed by Kevin Shulman.

Chart performance

References

2009 singles
Marques Houston songs
2009 songs
Universal Records singles
The Ultimate Group singles
Songs written by Marques Houston
Songs written by Detail (record producer)
Songs written by Chris Stokes (director)